The General Dutch Fascist League (in Dutch Algemeene Nederlandsche Fascisten Bond, ANFB) was a Dutch fascist party. It was founded on 29 June 1932 and dissolved in 1934. The leader of ANFB was Jan Baars, a merchant from Amsterdam.

History
ANFB won 17,157 votes in the general elections of 1933, 0.46% of the total. This was insufficient for a seat in parliament.

ANFB then entered into a 'corporative concentration' with the followers of Alfred Haighton and the National Union. Jan Baars did not get on with Carel Gerretson (the leader of National Union), therefore Baars quit ANFB. Consequently, ANFB floundered without its leader and disappeared.

Ideology
The party sought to create a volksfascisme, although they failed to fully define this aim and were considered closer to Benito Mussolini than Adolf Hitler despite their rhetoric.

References

Further reading

Fascist parties in the Netherlands